Presidential elections were held in South Ossetia on 10 November 1996. The result was a victory for the incumbent head of state Lyudvig Chibirov, who received 52% of the vote.

Background
This was the first election in the region since the 1990 Georgian Supreme Soviet election before the collapse of the USSR and Georgian independence. Since prior to the region's breakaway in 1991, the head of state's title had been 'Chairman of the Presidium of the South Ossetian Supreme Council', a role equivalent to Speaker, and there had been three officeholders since the declaration of independence: Torez Kulumbegov from 1990 to his imprisonment in 1991, then Znaur Gassiev who held the role during Torez's imprisonment in 1991–1992, before Torez returned to the position in 1992; he was succeeded in 1993 by Lyudvig Chibirov, who held office until 1996 when the Parliament of South Ossetia issued a series of amendments to the constitution which created a new presidential form of government.

Results
Chibirov was elected with 52% of the vote, meaning no runoff was required. Gerasim Khugayev finished second with 24% while three other candidates collectively received 24% of the vote.

Reactions
Georgian President Eduard Shevardnadze stated that the elections "cannot be considered legitimate", but said that the peace process "should go ahead".

References

South Ossetia
Presidential
Presidential elections in South Ossetia
South Ossetia
Election and referendum articles with incomplete results